The United States House Natural Resources Subcommittee on Federal Lands is one of the five subcommittees within the House Natural Resources Committee. Until the 118th Congress, it was known as the Subcommittee on National Parks, Forests and Public Lands.

Jurisdiction
Measures and matters related to the National Park System and its units, including Federal reserved water rights.
The National Wilderness Preservation System.
Wild and Scenic Rivers System, National Trails System, national heritage areas and other national units established for protection, conservation, preservation or recreational development, other than coastal barriers.
Military parks and battlefields, national cemeteries administered by the Secretary of the Interior, parks in the within the vicinity of the District of Columbia and the erection of monuments to the memory of individuals.
Federal and non-Federal outdoor recreation plans, programs and administration including the Land and Water Conservation Fund Act of 1965 and the Outdoor Recreation Act of 1963.
Preservation of prehistoric ruins and objects of interest on the public domain and other historic preservation programs and activities, including national monuments, historic sites and programs for international cooperation in the field of historic preservation.
Matters concerning the following agencies and programs: Urban Parks and Recreation Recovery Program, Historic American Buildings Survey, Historic American Engineering Record, and the U.S. Holocaust Memorial Museum. 
Public lands generally, including measures or matters relating to entry, easements, withdrawals, grazing and Federal reserved water rights.
Forfeiture of land grants to alien ownership, including alien ownership of mineral lands.
Cooperative efforts to encourage, enhance and improve international programs for the protection of the environment and the conservation of natural resources otherwise within the jurisdiction of the Subcommittee.
Forest reservations, including management thereof, created from the public domain.
Public forest lands generally, including measures or matters related to entry, easements, withdrawals, grazing and Federal reserved water rights.
Wildlife resources, including research, restoration, refuges and conservation, including National Wildlife Refuges.
General and continuing oversight and investigative authority over activities, policies and programs within the jurisdiction of the Subcommittee.

Members, 117th Congress

Historical membership rosters

116th Congress

115th Congress

External links
 Subcommittee page

Natural Resources National Parks